Johan Zeier Cappelen (18 December 1913 – 16 September 2007) was a Norwegian jurist and ambassador.

He was born in Vang, Hedmark as a son of Hans Blom Cappelen (1879–1965) and a brother of Andreas Zeier Cappelen. The brothers were members of Mot Dag in the 1930s.

He served as Norwegian ambassador to Brazil from 1960 to 1962, Iceland from 1962 to 1965 and Yugoslavia from 1970. In the latter post he also had ambassador credentials to Bulgaria and from 1971 to Albania. He was decorated Commander of the Order of St. Olav in 1972, and with the Grand Cross of the Icelandic Order of the Falcon.

References

1913 births
2007 deaths
People from Hamar
Mot Dag
Norwegian jurists
Norwegian civil servants
Ambassadors of Norway to Brazil
Ambassadors of Norway to Iceland
Ambassadors of Norway to Yugoslavia
Ambassadors of Norway to Bulgaria
Ambassadors of Norway to Albania
Knights Grand Cross of the Order of the Falcon
Johan Zeier